In basketball statistics, rebound rate or rebound percentage is a statistic to gauge how effective a player is at gaining possession of the basketball after a missed field goal or free throw. Rebound rate is an estimate of the percentage of missed shots a player rebounded while he was on the floor. Using raw rebound totals to evaluate rebounding fails to take into account external factors unrelated to a player's ability, such as the number of shots taken in games and the percentage of those shots that are made. Both factors affect the number of missed shots that are available to be rebounded. Rebound rate takes these factors into account.

The formula are:

In the National Basketball Association (NBA), the statistic is available for seasons since the 1970–71 season. The highest career rebound rate by a player is 23.4, by Dennis Rodman. The highest rebound rate for one season is 29.7, also by Dennis Rodman, which he achieved during the  season. He also owned seven of the top ten rebound percentage seasons (four of the top five) in NBA history, all time.

References

Basketball statistics
Rates